The Last of the Australians was an Australian sitcom that was broadcast on the Nine Network in 1975 and 1976.

The comedy series was produced by Crawford Productions in two series of 13 episodes each. It was based on Alan Seymour's play The One Day of the Year and is about an irascible father and his interactions with family life.

Cast 
 Alwyn Kurts as Ted Cook
 Richard Hibbard as Gary Cook (episodes 1-13)
 Stephen Thomas as Gary Cook (episodes 14-26)
 Rosie Sturgess as Dot Cook 
 Terry Norris as Blue
 Maurie Fields as Barney

DVD release 
The complete series has been released on DVD in March 2018.

See also 
 List of Nine Network programs
 List of Australian television series

References

External links 
 

Australian television sitcoms
Nine Network original programming
1975 Australian television series debuts
1976 Australian television series endings